Kulsze  is a village in the administrative district of Gmina Banie Mazurskie, within Gołdap County, Warmian-Masurian Voivodeship, in north-eastern Poland, close to the border with the Kaliningrad Oblast of Russia. It is located in the historic region of Masuria.

History
The origins of the village date back to 1576, when Maciej Sapała bought land to establish a village. For centuries, it remained an ethnically Polish village.

References

Villages in Gołdap County
1576 establishments in the Polish–Lithuanian Commonwealth
Populated places established in 1576